Constantina Diță (formerly Constantina Diță-Tomescu born on January 23, 1970, in Turburea, Gorj County), is a Romanian long-distance runner, who specializes mainly in the half marathon and marathon. She was the marathon gold medallist at the 2008 Beijing Olympics, having previously won a bronze medal at the 2005 World Championships in Athletics. She also represented her country at the Olympics in 2000 and 2004.

She has a marathon best of 2:21:30 hours. She was the champion at the 2005 IAAF World Half Marathon Championships – the first Romanian to win that honour. She was the 2004 Chicago Marathon winner.

Career
As a child, Diță became interested in athletics and particularly admired Maricica Puică after seeing her win the 3000 metres gold at the 1984 Summer Olympics. Diță had her first successes at the 1999 European Cross Country Championships at which she won silver medals in the individual race and the team race with Romania. She began competing in the marathon and was tenth at the 2001 World Championships in Athletics. She ran in the Olympic marathon at the 2004 Summer Olympics in Athens (finishing twentieth) and went on to win the Chicago Marathon later that year, running a personal best of 2:21:30.

After winning the marathon bronze at the 2005 World Championships she became the World Half Marathon Champion. She won a silver medal at the 2006 IAAF World Road Running Championships and reached the podium of the 2007 London Marathon, taking third place.

Diță won the women's marathon at the 2008 Summer Olympics in 2 hours, 26 minutes and 44 seconds. At 38 years of age, she became the oldest Olympic marathon champion in history. Previously the oldest man to win an Olympic marathon was aged 37 and the oldest woman was aged 30. She lives and trains at altitude in Boulder, Colorado, and was married to her coach, Valeriu Tomescu, until they divorced in 2008.

She ran marathon at the 2012 Summer Olympics and finished in 86th place.

Personal bests
5000 metres – 15:28.91 min (2000)
10,000 metres – 31:49.47 min (2006)
Half marathon – 1:08:07 hrs (2006)
Marathon – 2:21:30 hrs (2005)

International competitions

Marathons

Awards
 Romanian sportsperson of the year: 2008
 AIMS Best Marathon Runner Award: 2008
 National Sports Award: 2009

References

External links

Official website
marathoninfo

1970 births
Living people
People from Gorj County
Romanian female long-distance runners
Romanian female marathon runners
Olympic athletes of Romania
Olympic gold medalists for Romania
Athletes (track and field) at the 2004 Summer Olympics
Athletes (track and field) at the 2008 Summer Olympics
Athletes (track and field) at the 2012 Summer Olympics
Medalists at the 2008 Summer Olympics
World Athletics Championships medalists
World Athletics Championships athletes for Romania
World Athletics Half Marathon Championships winners
Chicago Marathon female winners
Olympic gold medalists in athletics (track and field)
Recipients of the Association of International Marathons and Distance Races Best Marathon Runner Award